Dillon Heyliger (born 21 October 1989) is a Canadian cricketer who plays for the Canada national cricket team.

Personal life
Heyliger was born in Suddie on the Essequibo Coast of Guyana. He is one of four sons born to Orin and Tennessee Heyliger and attended the Abram Zuil Secondary School.

Domestic and franchise career
Heyliger represented Guyana in cricket at under-15 and under-19 level. He was selected in Guyana's squad for the 2011 Caribbean Twenty20 but did not play a game. He played club cricket in Guyana for Santos Sports Club in his home town of Suddie and later moved to the capital Georgetown where he played for Guyana Defense Force in the Georgetown Cricket Association. Heyliger also played club cricket in Antigua, Trinidad and England, making appearances for Basingstoke in the Hampshire League and Uxbridge in the Middlesex County Cricket League.

Heyliger moved to Canada in 2014. He began playing for Islanders in the Toronto District Cricket Association and switched to Vikings in 2015. On 3 June 2018, he was selected to play for the Montreal Tigers in the players' draft for the inaugural edition of the Global T20 Canada tournament. In June 2019, he was selected to play for the Montreal Tigers in the 2019 Global T20 Canada tournament.

In June 2021, he was selected to take part in the Minor League Cricket tournament in the United States following the players' draft.

International career
Heyliger made his List A debut for Canada in the 2018 ICC World Cricket League Division Two tournament on 8 February 2018.

In September 2018, he was named in Canada's squad for the 2018–19 ICC World Twenty20 Americas Qualifier tournament. In October 2018, he was named in Canada's squad for the 2018–19 Regional Super50 tournament in the West Indies. In April 2019, he was named in Canada's squad for the 2019 ICC World Cricket League Division Two tournament in Namibia.

In August 2019, he was named in Canada's squad for the Regional Finals of the 2018–19 ICC T20 World Cup Americas Qualifier tournament. He made his Twenty20 International (T20I) debut for Canada against the Cayman Islands on 18 August 2019. He finished the tournament as the leading wicket-taker, with eleven dismissals in five matches.

In September 2019, he was named in Canada's squad for the 2019 Malaysia Cricket World Cup Challenge League A tournament. In October 2019, he was named in Canada's squad for the 2019 ICC T20 World Cup Qualifier tournament in the United Arab Emirates. Ahead of the tournament, the International Cricket Council (ICC) named him as the player to watch in Canada's squad.

In October 2021, he was named in Canada's squad for the 2021 ICC Men's T20 World Cup Americas Qualifier tournament in Antigua. On 13 November 2021, in Canada's match against Argentina, Heyliger became the first bowler for Canada to take a five-wicket haul in T20Is. In February 2022, he was named in Canada's squad for the 2022 ICC Men's T20 World Cup Global Qualifier A tournament in Oman.

In July 2022, Heyliger was named in Canada's squad for the 2022 Canada Cricket World Cup Challenge League A tournament. In the opening match of the tournament, against Denmark, he took his first five-wicket haul in List A cricket.

References

External links
 

1989 births
Living people
Canadian cricketers
Canada Twenty20 International cricketers
Place of birth missing (living people)